The House of Savoy was a royal dynasty that was established in 1003 in the historical Savoy region. Through gradual expansion, the family grew in power from ruling a small Alpine county north-west of Italy to absolute rule of the Kingdom of Sicily from 1713 to 1720, when they were handed the island of Sardinia, over which they would exercise direct rule from then onward.

Through its junior branch of Savoy-Carignano, the House of Savoy led the Italian unification in 1860 and ruled the Kingdom of Italy until 1946; they also briefly ruled the Kingdom of Spain in the 19th century. The Savoyard kings of Italy were Victor Emmanuel II, Umberto I, Victor Emmanuel III, and Umberto II. The last monarch reigned for a few weeks before being deposed following the institutional referendum of 1946, after which the Italian Republic was proclaimed.

History
The name derives from the historical region of Savoy in the Alpine region between what is now France and Italy. Over time, the House of Savoy expanded its territory and influence through judicious marriages and international diplomacy. From rule of a region on the French–Italian border, the dynasty's realm grew to include nearly all of the Italian Peninsula by the time of its deposition.

Early history
The house descended from Humbert I, Count of Sabaudia (Umberto I "Biancamano"), (1003–1047 or 1048).  Humbert's family is thought to have originated near Magdeburg in Saxony, with the earliest recording of the family being two 10th-century brothers, Amadeus and Humbert.  Though Sabaudia was originally a poor county, later counts were diplomatically skilled, and gained control over strategic mountain passes in the Alps. Two of Humbert's sons were commendatory abbots at the Abbey of St. Maurice, Agaunum,  on the River Rhone east of Lake Geneva, and Saint Maurice is still the patron of the House of Savoy.

Humbert's son, Otto of Savoy succeeded to the title in 1051 after the death of his elder brother Amadeus I of Savoy and married the Marchioness Adelaide of Turin, passing the Marquessate of Susa, with the towns of Turin and Pinerolo, into the House of Savoy's possession.

They once had claims on the modern canton of Vaud, where they occupied the Château of Chillon in Switzerland, but their access to it was cut by Geneva during the Protestant Reformation, after which it was conquered by Bern. Piedmont was later joined with Sabaudia, and the name evolved into "Savoy". The people of Savoy were descended from the Celts and Romans.

Expansion, retreat and prosperity
By the time Amadeus VIII came to power in the late 14th century, the House of Savoy had gone through a series of gradual territorial expansions and he was elevated by the Holy Roman Emperor Sigismund to the Duke of Savoy in 1416.

In 1494, Charles VIII of France passed through Savoy on his way to Italy and Naples, which initiated the Italian War of 1494–98. During the outbreak of the Italian war of 1521-1526, Emperor Charles V stationed imperial troops in Savoy. In 1536, Francis I of France invaded Savoy and Piedmont, taking Turin by April of that year. Charles III, Duke of Savoy, fled to Vercelli.

When Emmanuel Philibert came to power in 1553 most of his family's territories were in French hands, so he offered to serve France's leading enemy the House of Habsburg, in the hope of recovering his lands. He served Philip II as Governor of the Netherlands from 1555 to 1559. In this capacity, he led the Spanish invasion of northern France and won a victory at St. Quentin in 1557.  He took advantage of various squabbles in Europe to slowly regain territory from both the French and the Spanish, including the city of Turin. He moved the capital of the duchy from Chambéry to Turin.

The 17th century brought about economic development to the Turin area and the House of Savoy took part in and benefitted from that. Charles Emmanuel II developed the port of Nice and built a road through the Alps towards France. And through skillful political manoeuvres territorial expansion continued. In the early 18th century in the War of the Spanish Succession Victor Amadeus switched sides to assist the Habsburgs and, via the Treaty of Utrecht, they rewarded him with large pieces of land in northeastern Italy and a Crown in Sicily. Savoy rule over Sicily lasted only seven years (1713–20).

The Kingdom of Italy

The crown of Sicily, the prestige of being kings at last, and the wealth of Palermo helped strengthen the House of Savoy further. In 1720 they were forced to exchange Sicily for Sardinia as a result of the War of the Quadruple Alliance. On the mainland, the dynasty continued its expansionist policies as well. Through advantageous alliances during the War of the Polish Succession and War of the Austrian Succession, Charles Emmanuel III gained new lands at the expense of the Austrian-controlled Duchy of Milan.

In 1792 Piedmont-Sardinia joined the First Coalition against the French First Republic. It was beaten in 1796 by Napoleon and forced to conclude the disadvantageous Treaty of Paris (1796), giving the French army free passage through Piedmont. In 1798, Joubert occupied Turin and forced Charles Emmanuel IV to abdicate and leave for the island of Sardinia. Eventually, in 1814 the kingdom was restored and enlarged with the addition of the former Republic of Genoa by the Congress of Vienna.

In the meantime, nationalist figures such as Giuseppe Mazzini were influencing popular opinion. Mazzini believed that Italian unification could only be achieved through a popular uprising, but after the failure of the 1848 revolutions, the Italian nationalists began to look to the Kingdom of Sardinia and its prime minister Count Cavour as leaders of the unification movement. In 1848, Charles Albert conceded a constitution known as the Statuto Albertino to Piedmont-Sardinia, which remained the basis of the Kingdom's legal system even after Italian unification was achieved and the Kingdom of Sardinia became the Kingdom of Italy in 1861.

The Kingdom of Italy was the first Italian state to include the Italian Peninsula since the fall of the Roman Empire. But when Victor Emmanuel was crowned King of Italy in 1861, his realm did not include the Venetia region (subject to Habsburg governance), Lazio (with Rome), Umbria, Marche and Romagna (with the Papal town of Bologna). Yet the House of Savoy continued to rule Italy for several decades, through the Italian Independence wars as Italian unification proceeded and even as the First World War raged on in the early 20th century.

Massacres

In April 1655, based on (perhaps false) reports of resistance by the Waldensians, a Protestant religious minority, to a plan to resettle them in remote mountain valleys, Charles Emmanuel II ordered their general massacre. The massacre was so brutal it aroused indignation throughout Europe. Oliver Cromwell, then ruler in England, began petitioning on behalf of the Waldensians, writing letters, raising contributions, calling a general fast in England, and threatening to send military forces to the rescue. The massacre prompted John Milton's famous sonnet, "On the Late Massacre in Piedmont".

In 1898, the Bava Beccaris massacre in Milan involved the use of cannons against unarmed protesters (including women and old people) during riots over the rising price of bread. King Umberto I of the House of Savoy congratulated General Fiorenzo Bava Beccaris for the massacre and decorated him with the medal of Great Official of Savoy Military Order, greatly outraging a large part of the public opinion. As a result, Umberto I was assassinated in July 1900 in Monza by Gaetano Bresci, the brother of one of the women massacred in the crowd, who had traveled back to Italy from the United States for the assassination. The king had previously been the target of failed assassination attempts by anarchists Giovanni Passannante and Pietro Acciarito.

Fascism and end of monarchy
When the First World War ended, the Treaty of Versailles fell short of what had been promised in the London Pact to Italy. As the economic conditions in Italy worsened after the war, popular resentment and along with it the seeds of Italian fascism began to grow and resulted in the March on Rome by Benito Mussolini.

General Pietro Badoglio advised King Victor Emmanuel III that he could easily sweep Mussolini and his rag-tag Blackshirt army to one side, but Victor Emmanuel decided to tolerate Mussolini and appointed him as prime minister on 28 October 1922.  The king remained silent as Mussolini engaged in one abuse of power after another from 1924 onward, and did not intervene in 1925-26 when Mussolini dropped all pretense of democracy.  By the end of 1928, the king's right to remove Mussolini from office was, at least theoretically, the only check on his power. Later, the King's failure, in the face of mounting evidence, to move against the Mussolini regime's abuses of power led to much criticism and had dire future consequences for Italy and for the monarchy itself.

Italy conquered Ethiopia in 1936 and Victor Emmanuel was crowned as Emperor of Ethiopia. He added the Albanian crown as well in 1939, but lost Ethiopia two years later, in 1941. However, as Mussolini and the Axis powers failed in the Second World War in 1943, several members of the Italian court began putting out feelers to the Allies, who in turn let it be known that Mussolini had to go.  After Mussolini received a vote of no confidence from the Fascist Grand Council on 24 July, Victor Emmanuel dismissed him from office, relinquished the Ethiopian and Albanian crowns, and appointed Pietro Badoglio as prime minister. On 8 September the new government announced it had signed an armistice with the Allies five days earlier.  However, Victor Emmanuel made another blunder when he and his government fled south to Brindisi, leaving his army without orders.

As the Allies and the Resistance gradually chased the Nazis and Fascists off the peninsula, it became apparent that Victor Emmanuel was too tainted by his earlier support of Mussolini to have any postwar role.  Accordingly, Victor Emmanuel transferred most of his powers to his son, Crown Prince Umberto, in April 1944.  Rome was liberated two months later, and Victor Emmanuel transferred his remaining powers to Umberto and named him Lieutenant General of the Realm.  Within a year, public opinion pushed for a referendum to decide between retaining the monarchy or becoming a republic. On 9 May 1946, in a last-ditch attempt to save the monarchy, Victor Emmanuel formally abdicated in favour of his son, who became Umberto II. It did not work; the Italian constitutional referendum, 1946 was won by republicans with 54% of the vote. Victor Emmanuel went into exile in Egypt, dying there a year later.

On 12 June 1946, the Kingdom of Italy formally came to an end as Umberto transferred his powers to Prime Minister Alcide de Gasperi and called for the Italian people to support the new republic.  He then went into exile in Portugal, never to return; he died in 1983.

Under the Constitution of the Italian Republic, the republican form of government cannot be changed by constitutional amendment, thus forbidding any attempt to restore the monarchy short of adoption of an entirely new constitution. The constitution also forbade male descendants of the House of Savoy from entering Italy. This provision was removed in 2002 but as part of the deal to be allowed back into Italy, Vittorio Emanuele, the last claimant to the House of Savoy, renounced all claims to the throne.

House of Savoy today
The Residences of the Royal House of Savoy in Turin and the neighbourhood are protected as a World Heritage Site. Although the titles and distinctions of the Italian royal family are not legally recognised by the Italian Republic, the remaining members of the House of Savoy, like dynasties of other abolished monarchies, still use some of the various titles they acquired over the millennium of their reign prior to the republic's establishment, including Duke of Savoy, "Prince of Naples" previously conferred by Joseph Bonaparte to be hereditary on his children and grandchildren, Prince of Piedmont and Duke of Aosta

Before, the leadership of the House of Savoy was contested by two cousins: Vittorio Emanuele, Prince of Naples, who used to claim the title of King of Italy, and Prince Amedeo, Duke of Aosta, who claimed the title of Duke of Savoy. Their rivalry has not always been peaceful — on 21 May 2004, following a dinner held by King Juan Carlos I of Spain on the eve of the wedding of his son Felipe, Prince of Asturias, Vittorio Emanuele punched Amedeo twice in the face.

Some of the activities of members of the House of Savoy have evoked media coverage disappointing to Italian royalists. In November 1991, after thirteen years of legal proceedings, the Paris Assize Court acquitted Vittorio Emanuele of the fatal wounding and unintentional homicide in August 1978 of Dirk Hamer, finding him guilty only of unauthorised possession of a firearm during the incident. On 16 June 2006 Vittorio Emanuele was arrested in Varenna and imprisoned in Potenza on charges of corruption and recruitment of prostitutes for clients of the Casinò di Campione of Campione d'Italia. After several days, Vittorio Emanuele was released and placed under house arrest instead. He was released from house arrest on 20 July but was required to remain within the territory of the Republic.

When incarcerated in June 2006, Vittorio Emanuele was recorded admitting with regard to the killing of Dirk Hamer that "I was in the wrong, [...] but I must say I fooled them [the French judges]", leading to a call from Hamer's sister Birgit for Vittorio Emanuele to be retried in Italy for the killing. After a long legal fight, Birgit Hamer obtained the full video. The story was broken in the press by aristocratic journalist Beatrice Borromeo, who also wrote the preface for a book on the murder Delitto senza castigo by Birgit Hamer. Vittorio Emanuele sued the newspaper for defamation, claiming the video had been manipulated. In 2015, a court judgement ruled in favor of the newspaper.

In 2007, lawyers representing Vittorio Emanuele and his son Emanuele Filiberto of Savoy wrote to Italian President Giorgio Napolitano seeking damages for their years in exile. During a television interview, Emanuele Filiberto also requested that Roman landmarks such as the Quirinale palace and Villa Ada should be returned to the Savoy family. The Italian prime minister’s office has released a statement stating that the Savoys are not owed any damages and suggesting that Italy may demand damages from the Savoys for their collusion with Benito Mussolini. The Italian constitution contains a clause stripping the Savoys of their wealth on exile. Emanuele Filiberto acknowledged that his fiancée, whose pregnancy was revealed at the time of the couple's engagement, belonged to a more leftist milieu than his own, a fact which initially displeased his father.

Judicially separated since 1976, civilly divorced in 1982, and their marriage religiously annulled in 1987, Amedeo of Aosta's first wife, Princess Claude d'Orléans, revealed that she was aware that her husband fathered a child by another woman during their marriage. Aosta acknowledged paternity of another child, born out-of-wedlock in 2006 during his second marriage, but agreed to contribute financially to the child's care only after being directed to do so by court order.

The patrilineal lineage of the House of Savoy was reduced to four males between 1996 and 2009. In 2008 Aimone of Savoy-Aosta married Princess Olga of Greece, his second cousin, and they became the parents of sons Umberto and Amedeo born, respectively, in 2009 and 2011.

In 2019, Vittorio Emanuele issued a formal decree that modified the medieval law restricting succession to male heirs to place his granddaughter, Vittoria Cristina Chiara Adelaide Marie, in the line of succession. Prince Aimone declared the change illegitimate.

As of 2022, the House of Savoy has been in the process of trying to reclaim family jewels which have been owned by the Italian government since the abolition of the monarchy.

Orders of knighthood
The House of Savoy has held two dynastic orders since 1362 which were brought into the Kingdom of Italy as national orders. Although the Kingdom ceased to exist in 1946, King Umberto II did not abdicate his role as fons honorum over the two dynastic orders over which the family has long held sovereignty and grand mastership. Today, following the dispute, both Prince Vittorio Emanuele and Prince Aimone claim to be hereditary Sovereign and Grand Master of the following orders of the House of Savoy:
  Supreme Order of the Most Holy Annunciation (founded in 1362)
  Order of Saints Maurice and Lazarus (founded in 1572)
In addition to these, Vittorio Emanuele claims sovereignty over two more orders:
  Civil Order of Savoy (founded in 1831)
  Order of the Crown of Italy (founded in 1868 and no longer bestowed; replaced by the Order of Merit of Savoy in 1988)

Recently, all three of Vittorio Emanuele's sisters (Princess Maria Pia, Princess Maria Gabriella, and Princess Maria Beatrice) resigned from the Supreme Order of the Most Holy Annunciation and the Order of Saints Maurice and Lazarus, alleging that memberships in the orders had been sold to unworthy candidates, a newfound practice they could not abide.

List of rulers

Counts of Savoy

 Humbert I "Biancamano" ("White hand"), Count 1003–1047/1048 (c. 972/975–1047/48)
 Amadeus I, Count 1048–1051 (d. c. 1052)
  Otto, Count 1051–1060 (c. 1020–1060)
 Peter I, Count 1060–1078 (1048/49–1078)
  Amadeus II, Count 1060–1080 (c. 1046–1080)
  Humbert II, Count 1080–1103 (c. 1072–1103)
  Amadeus III, Count 1103–1148 (c. 1095–1148)
  Humbert III, Count 1148–1189 (1136–1189)
  Thomas I, Count 1189–1233 (1178–1233)
 Amadeus IV, Count 1233–1253 (1197–1253)
  Boniface, Count 1253–1263 (1244-1263)
 Peter II, Count 1263–1268 (1203–1268)
 Philip I, Count 1268–1285 (1207–1285)
  Thomas II, regent 1253–1259 (1199-1259)
  Amadeus V, Count 1285–1323 (1249–1323)
 Edward I, Count 1323–1329 (1284–1329)
  Aimone, Count 1329–1343 (1291–1343)
  Amadeus VI, Count 1343–1383 (1334–1383)
  Amadeus VII, Count 1383–1391 (1360–1391)
  Amadeus VIII, Count 1391–1416 (1383–1451)

Dukes of Savoy  

 Amadeus VIII, Duke of Savoy 1416–1434, Antipope Felix V 1439–1449 (1383–1451), abdicated (from both)
  Louis I, Duke of Savoy 1434–1465 (1413–1465)
 Amadeus IX, Duke of Savoy 1465–1472 (1435–1472)
 Philibert I, Duke of Savoy 1472–1482 (1465–1482)
  Charles I, Duke of Savoy 1482–1490 (1468–1490)
  Charles (II) John Amadeus, Duke of Savoy 1490–1496 (1490–1496)
  Philip II, Duke of Savoy 1496–1497 (1438–1497)
 Philibert II, Duke of Savoy 1497–1504 (1480–1504)
  Charles III, Duke of Savoy 1504–1553 (1486–1553)
  Emmanuel Philibert, Duke of Savoy 1553–1580 (1528–1580)
  Charles Emmanuel I, Duke of Savoy 1580–1630 (1562–1630)
 Victor Amadeus I, Duke of Savoy 1630–1637 (1587–1637)
 Francis Hyacinth, Duke of Savoy 1637–1638 (1632–1638)
  Charles Emmanuel II, Duke of Savoy 1638–1675 (1634–1675)
  Victor Amadeus II, Duke of Savoy 1675–1730, later King of Sicily then Sardinia (see below) (1666–1732), abdicated
  Thomas Francis, 1st Prince of Carignano 1620–1656 (1596–1656), ancestor of all remaining dynasts

Kings of Sicily
 Victor Amadeus II, King of Sicily 1713–1720 (1666–1732)

Kings of Sardinia  

 Charles Emmanuel I, Duke of Savoy 1580–1630 (1562–1630)
 Victor Amadeus I, Duke of Savoy 1630–1637 (1587–1637)
  Charles Emmanuel II, Duke of Savoy 1638–1675 (1634–1675)
  Victor Amadeus II, King of Sardinia 1720–1730 (1666–1732), abdicated
  Charles Emmanuel III, King of Sardinia 1730–1773 (1701–1773)
  Victor Amadeus III, King of Sardinia 1773–1796 (1726-1796)
 Charles Emmanuel IV, King of Sardinia 1796–1802 (1751–1819), abdicated
 Victor Emmanuel I, King of Sardinia 1802–1821 (1759–1824), abdicated
  Charles Felix, King of Sardinia 1821–1831 (1765–1831)
  Thomas Francis, 1st Prince of Carignano 1620–1656 (1596–1656)
  Emmanuel Philibert, 2nd Prince of Carignano 1656–1709 (1628–1709)
  Victor Amadeus I, 3rd Prince of Carignano 1709–1741 (1690–1741)
  Louis Victor, 4th Prince of Carignano 1741–1778 (1721–1778)
  Victor Amadeus II, 5th Prince of Carignano 1778–1780 (1743–1780)
  Charles Emmanuel, 6th Prince of Carignano 1780–1800 (1770–1800)
  Charles Albert, 7th Prince of Carignano 1800–1831, King of Sardinia 1831–1849 (1798–1849), abdicated
  Victor Emmanuel II, King of Sardinia 1849–1861 (1820–1878)

Kings of Italy  

 Victor Emmanuel II, King of Italy 1861–1878 (1820–1878)
  Umberto I, King of Italy 1878–1900 (1844–1900)
  Victor Emmanuel III, King of Italy 1900–1946 (1869–1947), abdicated
  Umberto II, King of Italy 1946 (1904–1983), deposed

Emperors of Ethiopia

 Victor Emmanuel III, Emperor of Ethiopia 1936–1941 (1869–1947) - contested by Emperor in exile Haile Selassie I.

Kings of Albania

 Victor Emmanuel III, King of Albania 1939–1943 (1869–1947)

Kings of Spain

 Amadeo I, King of Spain 1870–1873 (1845–1890), son of Victor Emmanuel II of Italy

World War II Croatia
In 1941, in the fascist puppet state Independent State of Croatia, Prince Aimone, Duke of Aosta, grandson of Amadeo I of Spain, was formally named as the king under the name Tomislav II, but never ruled in practice as he remained residing in Italy, and formally abdicated in 1943 when Italy ended participation with the Axis Powers.

Cyprus, Jerusalem and Armenia

In 1396, the title and privileges of the final king of the Armenian Kingdom of Cilicia, Levon V, were transferred to James I, his cousin and king of Cyprus. The title of King of Armenia was thus united with the titles of King of Cyprus and King of Jerusalem. The title was held to the modern day by the House of Savoy.

Titles of the Crown of Sardinia

VITTORIO AMEDEO III, per la grazia di Dio Re di Sardegna, Cipro, Gerusalemme e Armenia; Duca di Savoia, Monferrato, Chablais, Aosta e Genevese; Principe di Piemonte ed Oneglia; Marchese in Italia, di Saluzzo, Susa, Ivrea, Ceva, Maro, Oristano, Sezana; Conte di Moriana, Nizza, Tenda, Asti, Alessandria, Goceano; Barone di Vaud e di Faucigny; Signore di Vercelli, Pinerolo, Tarantasia, Lumellino, Val di Sesia; Principe e Vicario perpetuo del Sacro Romano Impero in Italia.

The English translation is: Victor Amadeus III, by the Grace of God, King of Sardinia, Cyprus, Jerusalem, Armenia, Duke of Savoy, Montferrat, Chablais, Aosta and Genevois, Prince of Piedmont and Oneglia, Marquis (of the Holy Roman Empire) in Italy, of Saluzzo, Susa, Ivrea, Ceva, Maro, Oristano, Sezana, Count of Maurienne, Nice, Tende, Asti, Alessandria, Goceano, Baron of Vaud and Faucigny, Lord of Vercelli, Pinerolo, Tarentaise, Lumellino, Val di Sesia, Prince and perpetual Vicar of the Holy Roman Empire in Italy.

Titles of the Crown of Italy
Victor Emmanuel II, by the Grace of God and the Will of the Nation, King of Italy, King of Sardinia, Cyprus, Jerusalem, Armenia, Duke of Savoy, Count of Maurienne, Marquis (of the Holy Roman Empire) in Italy; Prince of Piedmont, Carignano, Oneglia, Poirino, Trino; Prince and Perpetual vicar of the Holy Roman Empire; Prince of Carmagnola, Montmellian with Arbin and Francin, Prince bailiff of the Duchy of Aosta, Prince of Chieri, Dronero, Crescentino, Riva di Chieri e Banna, Busca, Bene, Brà, Duke of Genoa, Monferrat, Aosta, Duke of Chablais, Genevois, Duke of Piacenza, Marquis of Saluzzo (Saluces), Ivrea, Susa, del Maro, Oristano, Cesana, Savona, Tarantasia, Borgomanero e Cureggio, Caselle, Rivoli, Pianezza, Govone, Salussola, Racconigi con Tegerone, Migliabruna e Motturone, Cavallermaggiore, Marene, Modane e Lanslebourg, Livorno Ferraris, Santhià Agliè, Centallo e Demonte, Desana, Ghemme, Vigone, Count of Barge, Villafranca, Ginevra, Nizza, Tenda, Romont, Asti, Alessandria, del Goceano, Novara, Tortona, Bobbio, Soissons, Sant'Antioco, Pollenzo, Roccabruna, Tricerro, Bairo, Ozegna, delle Apertole, Baron of Vaud e del Faucigni, Lord of Vercelli, Pinerolo, della Lomellina, della Valle Sesia, del marchesato di Ceva, Overlord of Monaco, Roccabruna and 11/12th of Menton, Noble patrician of Venice, patrician of Ferrara.

These titles were used during the unified Kingdom of Italy which lasted from 1860–1946.

See also
 Duke of Aosta
 Counts of Villafranca
 Duke of Genoa
 List of rulers of Savoy
 List of consorts of Savoy
 County of Savoy
 Duchy of Savoy
 Kingdom of Sardinia
 List of monarchs of Sardinia
 List of Sardinian consorts
 Kingdom of Italy
 King of Italy
 List of Italian queens

Notes

References

Further reading
 Francesco Cognasso: I Savoia nella politica europea. Milano, 1941 (Storia e politica).
 Robert Katz: The Fall of the House of Savoy. A Study in the Relevance of the Commonplace or the Vulgarity of History, London 1972.
 Eugene L. Cox: The Eagles of Savoy. The House of Savoy in thirteenth-century Europe. Princeton, N.J., 1974.
 Denis Mack Smith: Italy and its Monarchy, New Haven, 1992.
 Toby Osborne: Dynasty and Diplomacy in the Court of Savoy. Political Culture and the Thirty Years' War (Cambridge Studies in Italian History and Culture), Cambridge 2002.
 Paolo Cozzo: La geografia celeste dei duchi di Savoia. Religione, devozioni e sacralità in uno Stato di età moderna (secoli XVI-XVII), Bologna, il Mulino, 2006, 370 pp.
 Enrico Castelnuovo (a cura di): La Reggia di Venaria e i Savoia. Arte, magnificenza e storia di una corte europea. Vol. 1–2. Turin, Umberto Allemandi & C., 2007, 364 + 309 pp.
 Walter Barberis (a cura di): I Savoia. I secoli d'oro di una dinastia europea. Torino, Giulio Einaudi Editore, 2007, 248 pp.

External links

 Official website of the House of Savoy
 Official website of the Prince of Naples
 Ordini Dinastici della Real Casa Savoia (in Italian)
 Brief history of the House with a picture of coat-of-arms
 Genealogy of recent members of the House
 Titles of the rulers of Savoy and Sardinia

 
European royal families
Shroud of Turin
1000s establishments in the Holy Roman Empire
1003 establishments in Europe